Camilo Pérez may refer to:

Camilo Pérez (boxer) (born 1990), Puerto Rican boxer
Camilo Pérez (footballer) (born 1985), Colombian footballer